Eugene W. Craig (September 5, 1916 – March 18, 1984) was an American cartoonist whose work was published in The News-Sentinel, the Brooklyn Eagle, and The Columbus Dispatch.

References

1916 births
1984 deaths
People from Fort Wayne, Indiana
American cartoonists
Deaths from lung cancer
Deaths from cancer in Ohio